Blastobasis crassifica is a moth in the family Blastobasidae. It was described by Edward Meyrick in 1916. It is found in Bengal and Sri Lanka.

The larvae have been recorded feeding on Crotalaria juncea.

References

Blastobasis
Moths described in 1916